Cold Day is Sonya Kitchell's debut release.  The EP was released on February 8, 2005.

Track listing
"Cold Day"  – 3:10
"Think of You"  – 4:08
"Tinted Glass"  – 4:18
"Clara"  – 4:42
"Fly Away"  – 4:06
"Someday"  – 5:16

2005 debut EPs
Sonya Kitchell albums